Assemblage Entertainment is an Indian animation studio based out of Mumbai, founded in December 2013, by industry veteran AK Madhavan (fondly known as Madmax). The studio distributes animation productions of major Hollywood studios and other independent production companies from around the world.

Background

In September 2015, Assemblage Entertainment completed work on its first feature animation film, Blinky Bill the Movie, a full-length feature film co-produced by Flying Bark Productions, Telegael.

Starting with a team of fewer than 20 artists in the suburbs of Mumbai, the company has grown rapidly into a studio of over 450 people, working on full-length features for global audiences. It has established itself as a leading independent player in animation, with numerous projects from global producers. The CEO of Google, Sundar Pichai mentioned Assemblage Entertainment as forbearer of their Google Cloud Platform at the GCP Next Global User Conference on 23 March 2016.

The company also experiments with different types of film making. Recently, it ventured into short-film making with Living Idle.

Visual effects
In 2021, the company set up their VFX unit and was one of the leading VFX studios to work on Rocketry: The Nambi Effect directed by R. Madhavan. The movie was premiered at the Cannes Film Festival and was appreciated by critics and audience alike.

Feature films

TV Show

DVD

References

External links
 

 
Indian animation studios
Film production companies based in Mumbai
2013 establishments in Maharashtra
Mass media companies established in 2013
Indian companies established in 2013